Wandinidae is a family of crustaceans belonging to the order Amphipoda.

Genera:
 Pseudocyphocaris Ledoyer, 1986
 Wandin Lowry & Stoddart, 1990

References

Amphipoda